Giuseppe Aquino may refer to:
 Giuseppe Aquino (footballer, born 1979), German-born Italian footballer
 Giuseppe Aquino (footballer, born 1983), Italian footballer